Osvaldo Díaz (born 28 March 1943) is a Cuban rower. He competed in two events at the 1964 Summer Olympics.

References

1943 births
Living people
Cuban male rowers
Olympic rowers of Cuba
Rowers at the 1964 Summer Olympics
Place of birth missing (living people)